KVER-CD (channel 41) is a low-power, Class A television station licensed to Indio, California, United States, serving the Coachella Valley as an affiliate of the Spanish-language Univision network. It is owned by Entravision Communications alongside UniMás affiliate KEVC-CD (channel 5, also licensed to Indio), Palm Springs–licensed NBC affiliate KMIR-TV (channel 36) and MyNetworkTV affiliate KPSE-LD (channel 50). KVER and KEVC share studios on Corporate Way in Palm Desert; KMIR and KPSE maintain separate facilities on Parkview Drive, also in Palm Desert. KVER's transmitter is located atop Edom Hill in Cathedral City.

KVER's signal was formerly relayed on low-powered translator KVES-LD (virtual channel 28, UHF digital channel 36) in Palm Springs.

Subchannels
The station's digital signal is multiplexed:

External links
KVER official webpage
Entravision official site

Indio, California
Univision network affiliates
VER-CD
Television channels and stations established in 1989
1989 establishments in California
VER-CD
Low-power television stations in the United States